SETARA Institute for Democracy and Peace is an Indonesia-based (NGO) that conducts research and advocacy on democracy, political freedom and human rights. SETARA Institute is a young research organization with core research focused on answering the actual needs of society. Its establishment in 2005 was intended as a response to fundamentalism, discrimination and violence on behalf of religion and morality in many fields that threaten pluralism and human rights in Indonesia. SETARA Institute works in secular space (human rights and constitution based law) and does not carry out research penetrating into religious theologies. SETARA Institute is a pioneering defender of freedom of religious belief in Indonesia. It promotes civil freedom and policy change to push for pluralism and human rights.

Reports
SETARA Institute has written several reports on freedom of religion and intolerance/discrimination against religious minorities. This includes a report on the persecution of the Internet Atheist Alexander Aan

In 2011, Setara Institute for Democracy and Peace recorded 244 acts of violence against religious minorities – nearly double the 2007 figure. Indonesian media has also used the institute as a source for criticizing oppression against the Sunni Muslim majority.

Boards

1. Executive
 Chairperson: Hendardi
 Vice Chairperson: Bonar Tigor Naipospos
 Secretary: R. Dwiyanto Prihartono
 Vice Secretary: Damianus Taufan
 Treasurer: Despen Ompusunggu
 Program Manager: Hilal Safary
 Research Director: Ismail Hasani
 Researcher : Aminudin Syarif
 Internal Manager: Diah Hastuti
 Chief of the Division of Public Participation and Mass Media: Asfin Situmorang
2. Advisers
 Chairperson: Azyumardi Azra
 Secretary: Benny Soesetyo
 Members: Kamala Chandrakirana, M. Chatib Basri, Rafendi Djamin

3. Founders

Abdurrahman Wahid, Ade Rostiana, Azyumardi Azra, Bambang Widodo Umar, Bara Hasibuan, Benny K. Harman, Benny Soesetyo, Bonar Tigor Naipospos, Budi Joehanto, Damianus Taufan, Despen Ompusunggu, Hendardi, Ismail Hasani, Kamala Chandrakirana, Luhut MP Pangaribuan, M. Chatib Basri, Muchlis T, Pramono Anung, Rachland Nashidik, Rafendi Djamin, R. Dwiyanto Prihartono, Robertus Robert, Rocky Gerung, Saurip Kadi, Suryadi A. Radjab, Syarif Bastaman, Theodorus W. Koerkeritz, Zumrotin KS

Programs
 Freedom of Religious and Belief
 Law and Human Rights
 Minority Rights
 Business and Human Rights
 Constitutional Democracy

See also
 Cultural relativism
 Democracy
 Democracy Index
 Human Development Index
 Human rights
 List of Indices of Freedom
 Negative rights

Address
SETARA Institute for Democracy and Peace
Jl. Hang Lekiu II No.41 Kebayoran Baru, Jakarta Selatan, Jakarta 12120, Indonesia, Phone: (021) 7208850, Mobile: 085100255123, Fax: (021) 22775683,

External links
Homepage: http://www.setara-institute.org/

Notes

Think tanks based in Indonesia
Freedom of expression organizations